Ivan Fomich Pavlov (25 June 1922 - 12 October 1950) was a ground attack pilot of the Soviet Air Forces during the Second World War. He served as both a flight and squadron commander in 6th Guards Assault Aviation Regiment during the conflict, for which he was twice named a Hero of the Soviet Union.

Early life
From 1931 to 1932 he lived in Terensai Stantsy, now in the Adamovsky District of Orenburg Oblast, moving in 1932 to the city of Magnitogorsk in Chelyabinsk Oblast. He completed a basic education and in 1940 finished 3 years of training in the Magnitogorsk Industrial Technical Academy and Magnitogorsk Aeroclub.

He joined the Red Army in December 1940, and in 1942 graduated from the Chkalov Military Pilots' School in Orenburg.

World War II
Pavlov fought in the Second World War as a ground-attack pilot on the Kalinin and Baltic Fronts. For his courage and heroism in the completion of over 127 sorties by October 1943 he was awarded the gold star of the Hero of the Soviet Union award and the Order of Lenin in February 1944. When the news of the award reached his home area a collection was organized and funds were raised for the completion of four ground-attack aircraft, one of which was presented to Pavlov himself. The aircraft bore the inscription: "To our compatriot Hero of the Soviet Union I. Pavlov - from the workers of Kostanay"

Pavlov had completed another 77 sorties by October 1944, and was consequently awarded the title of Hero of the Soviet Union for a second time. Altogether during the war he completed 237 sorties in the Ilyushin Il-2, in the course of which his crew downed one Me 109. He participated in the Rzhev-Sychev, Veliko-luki and Smolensk Operations, the Liberation of Belarus and the Baltic States as well as the liquidation of the Zemland Group of Forces. He suffered a concussion during those operations.

Postwar
In 1949 Pavlov graduated from the Frunze Military Academy and took command of the 947th Assault Regiment Aviation in the Prikarpatsky Military District. 

He was killed in a plane crash on 12 October 1950. He was buried in Kostanay where a bronze bust was erected in his memory, and a street in the town was also named in his honour. His name is eternally included in the active service list (an honour often extended to former Heroes of the Soviet Union who died whilst on active duty) and is thus inscribed in gold in the Central Armed Forces Museum in Moscow. Two educational institutions in Moscow and a school in his home village of Boris-Romanovka are also named after Pavlov and host exhibitions devoted to his memory. A small park north of his home town along the Tobol is named in his honor (at right).

Awards
 Twice Hero of the Soviet Union (4 February 1944 and 23 February 1945)
 Two Order of Lenin (4 February 1944 and 2 August 1944)
 Two Order of the Red Banner (26 September 1942 and 2 June 1943)
 Order of Alexander Nevsky (7 October 1944)
 Order of the Patriotic War 1st class (4 December 1942)

References

Bibliography
 

1922 births
1950 deaths
People from Kostanay Region
People from Kustanaysky Uyezd 
Russian aviators
Soviet World War II pilots
Heroes of the Soviet Union
Recipients of the Order of Lenin
Recipients of the Order of the Red Banner
Recipients of the Order of Alexander Nevsky
Victims of aviation accidents or incidents in the Soviet Union